The CIA Office of Inspector General exists to perform an inspector general (IG) function at the Central Intelligence Agency.

The first IG was appointed in 1952.

The 1970s
The Rockefeller Commission, Church Committee, and Pike Committee all recommended strengthening the office of OIG. Their criticisms included claims that the IG had few staff, was ignored, and was denied access to information. Their suggestions were not made into law.

1980s
The CIA OIG investigation of the Iran Contra scandal was criticized in the final report of the Congressional investigation of the Iran-Contra affair. Members of the Senate Select Committee on Intelligence (especially Boren, Cohen, Specter, and Glenn) wrestled with how to improve the IG while not interfering with the work of the CIA. They tried to make a bill that would satisfy various members of Congress and also not be vetoed by president George Bush. Senator Boren (chairman of the SSCI) worked with Robert Gates who was deputy to Brent Scowcroft at the time. In 1989 a new IG law was passed creating a more independent IG. The IG also would no longer be chosen by the Director of Central Intelligence but would instead be appointed by the President with the "advice and consent" of the Senate.

Global War on Terror
There were several controversies surrounding the IG during the years of the Global War on Terror.

The IG released a controversial report on failures of the intelligence community before 9/11.

IG staff Mary O. McCarthy was fired in 2006.

In 2007 General Michael Hayden, head of the CIA, had attorney Robert Deitz review the work of the IG.

2004 Inspector General Report
In 2004 the CIA OIG published a report on prisoner treatment in the Global War on Terror. It was entitled "CIA Inspector General Special Review: Counterterrorism Detention and Interrogation Activities". After a Freedom of Information Act lawsuit by the American Civil Liberties Union, a less redacted version was declassified in 2009 and released to the public.

List of Inspectors General

See also
 Inspector General
 Inspector General Act of 1978
 CIA's relationship with the United States Congress

References

External links

 
 
 

 

United States Inspectors General
Inspector General